Rambo (stylized on-screen as Rambo: First Blood Part II) is a 1985 video game based on the film Rambo: First Blood Part II (1985). The game was designed by David Collier and Tony Pomfret with the ZX Spectrum version converted by Platinum Productions.

The Commodore 64 version's music is by Martin Galway from Northern Ireland, incorporating melodies from the film's score. The Amstrad CPC version's music was played and recorded live by Choice Software's in-house programmer/designer/musician James Edward Cosby also from Northern Ireland, using a Yamaha DX7 synthesiser via the then new MIDI serial comms protocol.

Several other games based on the film were also released, including Rambo for the Nintendo Entertainment System, and Rambo: First Blood Part II for the Sega Master System.

Gameplay 

The game follows the movie's story. The player, controlling Rambo, has to find his lost equipment, locate the POW camp, rescue the hostages and make it back to the extraction point, while being pursued by constantly respawning enemies. Rambo starts off with just a Bowie knife and grenades (both of which have an unlimited supply, as with all the weapons), and gains points for killing the enemy, and for collecting the following equipment: Rocket Launcher, M16 Rifle, and Bow & Arrows (Explosive & Non Explosive).

The gameplay is based on Capcom's arcade game Commando (1985).

Reception and related releases 

Rambo was well received. Your Sinclair described it as "a thinking man's Commando. That game starts fast and gets faster until you end up like a one-man whirlwind. Rambo develops into a solid shoot'em up".

Rambo replaced Commando as the number one game in Gallup ZX Spectrum chart and did the same on the Commodore 64 and All Formats charts the following week. The Amstrad CPC version also went to number one eight weeks later, replacing Yie Ar Kung Fu.

The Amstrad CPC and ZX Spectrum versions of the game were included on the 1986 compilation They Sold a Million 3, along with Fighter Pilot, Ghostbusters, and Kung-Fu Master.

In 1989, Ocean released the game alongside Daley Thompson's Decathlon and Enduro Racer as one of the launch titles for their new budget range, The Hit Squad. It reached number 4 in the All Formats Budget Games chart.

References

External links 
 
 Rambo: First Blood Part II at MobyGames

1985 video games
Ocean Software games
Amstrad CPC games
Commodore 64 games
ZX Spectrum games
Rambo (franchise) video games
Video games based on films
Video games based on adaptations
Run and gun games
Stealth video games
Video games scored by Martin Galway
Video games set in Vietnam
Vietnam War video games
Video games developed in the United Kingdom